A disk utility is a utility program that allows a user to perform various functions on a computer disk, such as disk partitioning and logical volume management, as well as multiple smaller tasks such as changing drive letters and other mount points, renaming volumes, disk checking, and disk formatting, which are otherwise handled separately by multiple other built-in commands.  Each operating system (OS) has its own basic disk utility, and there are also separate programs which can recognize and adjust the different filesystems of multiple OSes. Types of disk utilities include disk checkers, disk cleaners and disk space analyzers

Disk cleaners

Disk cleaners are computer programs that find and delete potentially unnecessary or potentially unwanted files from a computer. The purpose of such deletion may be to free up disk space, to eliminate clutter or to protect privacy.

Disk space consuming unnecessary files include temporary files, trash, old backups and web caches made by web browsers. Privacy risks include HTTP cookies, local shared objects, log files or any other trace that may tell which computer program opened which files.

Disk cleaners must not be mistaken with antivirus software (which delete malware), registry cleaners (which clean Microsoft Windows Registry) or data erasure software (which securely delete files), although multifunction software (such as those included below) may fit into all these categories.

Disk compression utilities

A disk compression utility increases the amount of information that can be stored on a hard disk drive of given size. Unlike a file compression utility which compresses only specified files – and which requires the user designate the files to be compressed – an on-the-fly disk compression utility works automatically without the user needing to be aware of its existence.

When information needs to be stored to the hard disk, the utility will compress the information. When information needs to be read, the utility will decompress the information. A disk compression utility overrides the standard operating system routines. Since all software applications access the hard disk using these routines, they continue to work after disk compression has been installed. The compression/expansion process adds a small amount of overhead to disk access and may complicate error recovery on the affected volume. Also, if the compression utility's device driver was  uninstalled or became corrupted, all data on the disk would be lost.

Disk compression utilities were popular especially in the early 1990s, when microcomputer hard disks were still relatively small (20 to 80 megabytes). Hard drives were also rather expensive at the time, costing roughly 10 USD per megabyte. For the users who bought disk compression applications, the software proved to be in the short term a more economic means of acquiring more disk space as opposed to replacing their current drive with a larger one. A good disk compression utility could, on average, double the available space with negligible speed loss. Disk compression fell into disuse by the late 1990s, as advances in hard drive technology and manufacturing led to increased capacities and lower prices.

Some examples of disk compression utilities:
 DriveSpace for Microsoft Windows
 DiskDoubler for Macintosh
 SquashFS for Linux

Disk checkers

A disk checker is a utility program which can scan a hard disk to find files or areas that are corrupted in some way, or were not correctly saved, and eliminate them for a more efficiently operating hard drive. This is not to be confused with a disk cleaner, which can find files that are unnecessary for computer operation, or take up considerable amounts of space.

Some disk checkers can perform a whole surface scan to attempt to find any possible bad sectors, whereas others scan only the logical structure of files on the hard disk.

Operating systems often include one such tool. For example:
 CHKDSK
 fsck

Disk layout tools

Disk formatting and disk partitioning tools are responsible for generating low level disk layouts and file systems. Operating systems typically supply one or more programs performing these functions as part of their standard install:

In Windows:
 Logical Disk Manager
 format
 fdisk
 diskpart
In Mac OS:
 Disk Utility
In Linux:
 Logical Volume Manager
 GNOME Disks (also known as Disks or gnome-disk-utility or palimpsest)
 GNU Parted

Disk space analyzers

A disk space analyzer (or disk usage analysis software) is a software utility for the visualization of disk space usage by getting the size for each folder (including sub-folders) and files in a folder or drive. Most of these applications analyze this information to generate a graphical chart showing disk usage distribution according to folders or other user defined criteria.

Some disk space analyzers like DiskReport allow analysis of history of size and file count for each folder, to help find growing folders.

Examples:
 Directory Report
 WizTree
 DiskReport
 GNOME Disk Usage Analyzer
 KDE Filelight
 WinDirStat
 SpaceSniffer

References

Disk partitioning software
Hard disk software